Sword, in comics, may refer to:

 The Sword (comics), an Image Comics series from the Luna Brothers
 S.W.O.R.D. (comics), a Marvel Comics organisation that deals with alien threats
 Sword (Wildstorm), a Wildstorm character who first appeared in the Fire From Heaven crossover, he is an alternate universe version of Union
 Sword, the alter ego of Chic Carter, a Golden Age superhero who appeared in Smash Comics and Police Comics
 Sword of Sorcery, a title featuring Fafhrd and the Gray Mouser

See also
 Swords (disambiguation)
 Swordsman (comics)
 Silversword (comics)